Girl Trouble may refer to:

Film and television
 Girl Trouble (1942 film), an American film
 What's Good for the Goose, a 1969 British film also known as Girl Trouble
 "Girl Trouble" (Will & Grace), TV episode

Music
 Girl Trouble (band)
 "Girl Trouble", a song from the 1991 album Why Do Birds Sing? by the Violent Femmes

Other
 Girl Trouble (book)

See also 
 "Girls Ain't Nothing but Trouble", song